The elections to the Seventh Kerala Assembly were held on May 19, 1982.

Background 
After the election of 1980, the Left Democratic Front (LDF) formed a government led by E. K. Nayanar. By 20 October 1981, LDF lost their majority in the Assembly when the Congress (A), the Kerala Congress (M) and the Janatha (Gopalan) withdrew support for the government to join the UDF. E.K.Nayanar recommended to the Governor to dissolve the assembly and impose President's rule on 21 October 1981 which led to a mid-term election in 1982.

Use of electronic voting machines 
The election of 1982 has historic significance, as it is the first time Electronic Voting Machines (EVM) were used in the country. EVM was used in 50 booths of the Paravoor constituency of Ernakulam district. But it was later challenged in the High Court of Kerala, but the plea was dismissed. The case was moved to the Supreme Court, which ordered re-polling as those 50 booths had no provision in the electoral law for use of voting machines.

Results

Party results

Constituency results

References

External links 
 Kerala Assembly Election DATABASE

State Assembly elections in Kerala
1980s in Kerala
Kerala